Antonio Londoño (born 15 December 1954) is a Colombian former professional racing cyclist. He rode in the 1986 Tour de France and the 1985 Giro d'Italia.

Major results

1977
 1st Overall Vuelta Ciclista de Chile
1st Stage 8
 2nd Overall Clásica de Antioquia
1978
 1st Overall Clásica Domingo a Domingo
 2nd  Team time trial, Pan American Road Championships
 3rd  Team time trial, Central American and Caribbean Games
1979
 3rd Overall Vuelta Ciclista de Chile
1st Prologue (TTT)
1980
 1st Stage 7 Vuelta a Colombia
 2nd Overall Coors Classic
1981
 1st Stage 1 (TTT) Vuelta a Colombia
1983
 1st Stage 2a Clásico RCN
 1st Stage 2 (TTT) Vuelta a Colombia
1984
 2nd Overall Vuelta a Guatemala
1985
 1st  Overall Clásica de Antioquia
1986
 1st  Road race, National Road Championships
 1st Stage 2 (TTT) Vuelta a Colombia

References

External links

1954 births
Living people
Colombian male cyclists
Sportspeople from Medellín
Vuelta a Colombia stage winners